Gyuli Nizamievna Kambarova (Russian: Гюли Низамиевна Камбарова; 9 May 1982, Makhachkala, Russia) is a Dagestan and Russian composer who is a member of the Union of Composers of Russian Federation, member of the International Alliance for Women in Music, member of the Music Teachers National Association, and member of the Songwriters Guild of America. She authored the music for the documentaries "You Are Not Alone" and "Voice for the Voiceless", directed by Anna Barsukova. She lives and works in United States.

Life and career 
Gyuli Kambarova was born on May 9, 1982 in the city of Makhachkala in Republic of Dagestan, Russia. During her early music studies, she has won several youth piano competitions, including I. S. Bach competition - II prize, G. Hasanov competition - II prize, and E. Grieg competition - III prize. In 1996, she started to study piano at the Makhachkala College of Music named after Gotfrid Hasanov with Svetlana Papayan. In 1999 she entered the Lyceum of Music at the Rostov State Conservatory named after Sergei Rachmaninoff. She graduated from the Rostov State Conservatory with degrees in piano performance (2005; Professor Natalia Simonova) and composition with honors (2010; Professor Galina Gontarenko).

Kambarova started her career in Southern Russia, where she composed music, performed as a soloist and collaborative pianist, as well as taught piano performance and composition. Her pieces of various genres gained recognition and were widely performed at concerts, festivals and competitions throughout Russia.

Composing style 
Kambarova's works are distinguished by their unique personal voice, which combines Southern Russia melodies with the rigorous classical technique. The composer writes music of various genres and instrumentation. Her most recent significant projects are the movie scores for the documentaries "You are not Alone" (Russia, 2017) and "Voice for the Voiceless" (Russia, 2019), directed by Anna Barsukova.

Life in the United States 

Currently Kambarova lives in the US, where she teaches on faculty of the Louisville Academy of Music, Youth Performing Arts School and the University of Louisville School of Music. She sustains an active performing career, takes part in International music festivals and producing CD-albums with her original compositions. In 2019 she became a winner of the Commission Composer Competition organized by the Music Teachers National Association and was nominated for the Composer of the Year award, representing the state of Kentucky.

Family 

Husband, Samir Kambarov, is a saxophonist and serves of faculty of the University of Louisville as the lecturer in Jazz Studies. They are raising a son Timur.

Awards 

 Diploma "for the Outstanding Achievements in the Field of Professional Music Art" (Russia, 2019)
 Winner of the Annual Commissioned Composer Award by Kentucky Music Teachers Association (USA, 2019)
 Laureate Diploma at the Segey Agababov Composition Competition in Dagestan for the piece "Swallow" (Russia, 2019)
 III Prize at the 5th Prokofiev International Composition Competition (Russia, 2018)
 Winner of the International Competition 15 Minutes of Fame: Re-Imagining Schubert (USA, 2015)
 Laureate Diploma at the 8th All-Russian Composition Competition "Choir Laboratory XXI Century" in nomination ""Music on the Lyrics by Classical and Contemporary Poets" (Russia, 2015)
 Diploma for the music to the documentary "You are not Alone" at the Film Festival "Otzi i Deti" in the city of Oryol (Russia, 2017)
 CD "My Way" ranked among the best published CDs of 2016 by Ablaze Records (USA, 2016)
 Grant for the Best Pop Song from the Ministry of Culture of Dagestan (Russia, 2015)
 Grant for Soul of Love composition from the International Alliance for Women in Music (USA, 2014)
 Special Diplomas "for the Best Piece About Homeland" and "Composition Written on the Folk Text" at the 7th All-Russian Competition "Choir Laboratory XXI Century" (Russia, 2014)
 Member of the Union of Composers of Russian Federation (since 2012)
 Member of the International Alliance for Women in Music (since 2014)
 Member of the Russian Music Union (since 2018)
 Certificate of Honor from the city of Rostov-on-Don Administration "For teaching and preparing Contest Laureates" (Russia, 2010)
 Grant-aided student of the Rasul Gamzatov Foundation (Russia, 2007–2010)
 Grait-aided student of the Government of Dagestan Republic (2006–2008)

Discography 

 Dreams - piece for solo piano (2014)
 My Way - instrumental music (2016)
 Memories - cinema music (2018)

List of compositions 

 Piano sonata (3 mvts.)
 Suite "My Way" for alto saxophone, piano and percussion (3 mvts.: My Way, Baku, Caravan)
 Suite for alto saxophone and piano "Marine Pictures" (3 mvts.: Before the Storm, Cradle of the Sea, Neptune Feast)
 Christmas Suite for alto saxophone and piano (4 mvts.: Anticipation, Mischief, Confetti Flying, Sleigh Chase)
 Song Cycle to the verses by Rasul Gamzatov "In the Valley of the Peaks" (5 mvts.: Eagles are Silent, Dagestan, One Life, Sea, Swallow of Aul)
 Trio for violin, cello and piano (3 mvts.)
 Choral Suite to the verses by Rasul Gamzatov (5 mvts.: Freedom, What does the Day Bring to Us, Time, The Goal is Beautiful, Stop, Life Stop)
 Polyphonic Notebook for Piano
 Memorial Quintet for clarinet, violin, cello, piano and vibraphone
 Renaissance Quintet for soprano saxophone, violin, cello, piano and vibraphone
 Sonata for 2 clarinets and piano (3 mvts.)
 Concerto for violin and orchestra (3 mvts.)
 String Quartet (4 mvts.)
 Trio "Soul of Love" for violin, cello and piano
 Trio "Falling Leaves" for violin, cello and piano
 Romance for cello and piano
 Prelude Cycle "Dreams" for piano solo
 Suite "Californication" for piano solo
 Film Music for documentary "You are not Alone"
 Film Music for documentary "Voice for the Voiceless"
Quintette "Unchained" for alto saxophone, violin, cello, piano and percussion (3 mvts.)

References

External links 
 Official website

Living people
1982 births
People from Makhachkala
Russian women composers
Russian film score composers
Women film score composers
Russian emigrants to the United States
21st-century composers